Kristensson is a Swedish patronymic surname meaning "son of Kristen". Notable people with the surname include: 

 Krister Kristensson (born 1942), Swedish footballer
 Tom Kristensson (born 1991), Swedish rally driver

See also
 Ulf Kristersson (born 1963), Swedish politician

Swedish-language surnames
Patronymic surnames